Salvo D'Acquisto (15 October 1920 in Naples – 23 September 1943 in Fiumicino) was a member of the Italian Carabinieri during the Second World War.

After Italy switched sides in September 1943, joining the Allies, the Germans occupied the northern part of the country. On 22 September two German soldiers were killed and two others wounded when some boxes of abandoned munitions they were inspecting exploded. The Germans insisted it was sabotage, and the next day they rounded up 22 civilians to try to get them to name the saboteurs. The soldiers made the prisoners dig their own graves when they continued to assert their innocence. D'Acquisto, in charge of the local Carabinieri post, was taken to the prisoners. When it became clear that the Germans intended to kill them, D'Acquisto "confessed" to being solely responsible. He was executed by firing squad, but the civilians were released unharmed.

D'Acquisto was posthumously awarded the Gold Medal of Military Valor. He was given the title Servant of God by Pope John Paul II.

Life
Salvo D'Acquisto was born in Naples, the eldest of eight children, three of whom died as infants and another as a child. His father worked in a chemical factory. He left school at the age of 14, as was customary for working-class boys at the time.

He volunteered to join the Carabinieri in 1939 and left for Libya the next year, a few months before the start of the Second World War. After being wounded in the leg, he remained with his division until he contracted malaria. He returned to Italy in 1942 to attend officer school. He graduated as a vice-sergeant and was assigned to an outpost in Torre in Pietra, a little rural center on the Via Aurelia not far from Rome.

On 25 July 1943, Benito Mussolini was overthrown, and the new Italian government negotiated secretly with the Allies to switch sides. An armistice was officially announced on 8 September.

Death
After the 9–11 September fighting in Rome, elements of the German 2nd Parachute Division were detached to coastal defense duties, and a small unit was camped near an old military installation previously used by the Guardia di Finanza, in the vicinity of Palidoro, frazione of Fiumicino, which was in the territorial jurisdiction of the station of Torre in Pietra, another frazione of the same municipality. Here, on 22 September, German soldiers were inspecting boxes of abandoned munitions when there was an explosion. Two died and two others were wounded.

The commander of the German detachment blamed the death on "unnamed locals" and demanded the cooperation of the local Carabinieri post, at the moment under D'Acquisto's temporary command. The next morning, D'Acquisto, having gathered some information, tried in vain to explain that the deaths were an accident, but the Germans insisted on their version of events and demanded reprisals, according to a standing order issued by Feldmarschall Kesselring a few days before.

On 23 September, the Germans conducted searches and arrested 22 local residents. An armed squad took D'Acquisto by force from the station to the Torre di Palidoro, an ancient watchtower, where the prisoners were gathered. Under interrogation, all of the civilians said that they were innocent. When the Germans again demanded the names of the responsible persons, D'Acquisto replied that there were none – the explosion was accidental. The Germans ridiculed, insulted, and beat him, and tore his uniform.

Suddenly, the prisoners were handed shovels and forced to dig a mass grave for their own burial after execution. The digging went on for some time; when it was completed, it was obvious the Germans meant to carry out their threat. D'Acquisto then "confessed" to the alleged crime, declared that he alone was responsible for the "murder" and that the civilians were innocent, and demanded that they be released right away. One of those freed, 17- or 18-year-old Angelo Amadio, witnessed the execution by firing squad. D'Acquisto was 22.

Cause of beatification and canonization 
In 1983, Archbishop Gaetano Bonicelli announced the opening of a cause for beatification and canonization in the Military Ordinariate of Italy, Pope John Paul II declared D'Acquisto a Servant of God. The process of beatification of D'Acquisto took place on 4 November 1983 and ended on 25 November 1991 with the consequent transmission of the documents to the Congregation for the Causes of Saints.

On 15 October 1987, Gaudenzio Dell'Aja was appointed by Cardinal Corrado Ursi,  Archbishop of Naples archbishop delegate of the ecclesiastical tribunal for the canonical recognition of the mortal remains of D'Acquisto, which was carried out on 18 October 1987, at the Basilica of Santa Chiara in Naples, in the first chapel on the left, near the entrance.

In 1996, the same congregation was given a supplement of inquiry wanted by the new postulator. The initial postulator, however, had begun the cause of beatification to obtain the recognition of the "heroic virtues" while the subsequent postulator requested the recognition of the "heroic witness of charity," a definition applicable to martyr. In 2007 however a majority vote expressed in a conference of the Congregation for the Causes of Saints led to a suspension of the recognition as a martyr.

The figure of the soldier was however remembered by Pope John Paul II, who in a speech to the Carabinieri on 26 February 2001 said: The history of the Carabinieri shows that one can reach the peak of holiness in the faithful and generous fulfillment of the duties of one's state. I am thinking here of your colleague, Deputy Brigadier Salvo D'Acquisto, gold medal for military valor, whose cause for beatification is underway.

Legacy

A film, Salvo D'Acquisto (1974), was made about his sacrifice, directed by Romula Guerrieri and starring Massimo Ranieri. A 2003 TV mini-series was directed by Alberto Sironi and starred Beppe Fiorello.

An Italian postage stamp was issued in 1975 to commemorate him. The portrait was painted by the Italian artist Silvano Campeggi.

There are monuments honoring D'Acquisto, including in his native Naples, on the Via Aurelia near Rome, and in front of the train station at Cisterna.

Quote

"We have to conform ourselves to God's will whatever the cost in suffering or sacrifice."

References

External links

Carabinieri
People from Naples
Military personnel from Naples
1920 births
1943 deaths
Italian people of World War II
Recipients of the Gold Medal of Military Valor
Italian Servants of God
Italian people executed by Nazi Germany
Burials at the Basilica of Santa Chiara
People executed by Nazi Germany by firing squad